Bo Magnus "Mange" Schmidt (born 17 November 1973), is a Swedish rapper. He was born and raised in 
Stockholm.

Discography

Albums
 Mange Schmidt, Greatest Hits
 Samtidigt... i Stockholm (2006)
 Känslan kommer tillbaks (2007)
 Odenplan Stockholm 1988 (2009)
Ensam bland alla vänner (2013)

Singles
 "Glassigt" (2006)
 "Vem é han?" (2006)
 "Giftig" ft. Petter (2007)
 "Inget att förlora" (2008)
 "Vet att du förstår" (2009)
 "Ledig" (2009)
 "Wingman" (2010)
 "Allvarligt talat" ft. Vanessa Falk (2010)
 "My name is like the google guy" (2012)
"Hallå Konsument!" (2020)

See also
 Swedish hip hop

References

External links
Official site

Swedish rappers
Swedish-language singers
Living people
1973 births
Musicians from Stockholm